Seria oil field also known as Seria Field is the largest oil field in northwest Borneo, discovered in 1929. The oil is accumulated in Upper Miocene sandstone, trapped in Seria Anticline that straddles the present day coastline. This field has produced more than 1 billion barrels of oil for more than 75 years. Brunei Shell Petroleum (BSP) is the operator of this field.

History 
The exploration of the field started in late 1926, when F. F. Marriot (British Malay Petroleum Company Field Superintendent) and T. G. Cochrane (General Manager of Sarawak Oilfields Limited) smelled "oil" (H2S) in the Kuala Belait and asked Straub, a Swiss geophysicist, to do a geophysical analysis of the area.

A total of 36 oil wells were completed in 1935, while number of oil wells was increased to 53 in 1936. 

During the Japanese invasion, the oilfields in Seria have already been producing 17,000 barrels per day. At the end of World War II, the Japanese ignited 14 of the 21 wells in the Seria field before evacuating. Australian servicemen attempted to control the fires by stopping the flow of the wells.

By early 1950s, nodding donkeys were introduced to the oilfield. In 1953, a record breaking 36,496,599 barrels were produced, followed by a major blowout in well Seria 328 during a drilling operation.

The extensions of Seria oil field namely South West Ampa Field and Tali Field respectively began production in 1964 and 1978.

In 1982, the Seria Crude Oil Refinery, also commonly known as Seria Oil Refinery, began operations.

On 8 October 2004, Brunei Shell Petroleum made a new discovery in Seria North Flank which was an undrilled part of the oil field. The well was drilled 3 km offshore in 8 m of water by the Schlumberger self-propelled multi-purpose vessel.

Oil Fields 

 Tali oil field
 Enggang oil field
 Anduki oil field

Wells

To date, more than 900 wells have been drilled in Seria Field, and more than 350 wells are still in production. Key wells include:

 S-1 was the first exploration well, drilled in July 1928, which began producing oil in April 1929.
 S-2 was brought on stream in 1930. After two blow-outs followed by shutdowns and sabotage during the World War II, it settled to a steady flow on gas-lift and proved to be a valuable producer.
 S-5, which is still producing and is the earliest well still in production in Seria Field.
 S-328 was drilled in 1953 with a blow-out. With a power of a minor earthquake, it demolished an adjacent building and left a crater flooded with water.
 S-454 was spudded in the middle of a housing area.
 S-516 was drilled in 1956 with a serious blow-out. A jet of oil, gas and sand rose over 30 meters into the air, and the well had to be 'killed' with 90 tonnes of mud and plugging material.
 S-558 was drilled in 1964 across the road from Brunei Shell's head office.

References

Further reading 
Brunei Shell Petroleum, 1988, The Billionth Barrel Seria Oilfield
Sandal, S. T. (eds.), 1996, The Geology and Hydrocarbon Resources of Negara Brunei Darussalam.

 Drilling Uphill Geo ExPro, Vol 7 No 3, Paul Wood, 2010

Belait District
Peak oil
Oil fields in Brunei